Charles Frederick Lloyd was a pipe organ builder in Nottingham, England, who flourished between 1909 and 1928.

Background
Charles Frederick Lloyd was the son of Charles Lloyd who had established an organ building business in Nottingham.

In 1909, Charles Frederick Lloyd took over the business, Charles Lloyd & Co., after the death of his father, and the business continued until 1928 with no change to the name. In 1928, the business was bought by Roger Yates.

Lloyd was also the organist of St. Ann's Church, Nottingham.

Company names and addresses
Lloyd and Valentine 1859 - 1860, Bilbie Street, Nottingham
Lloyd and Dudgeon 1862 - 1876, 52A Union Road, Nottingham
C. Lloyd & Co 1876 - 1896, 52A Union Road, Nottingham
C. Lloyd & Co 1896 - 1928, 79 Brighton Street, St Ann’s, Nottingham

References

20th-century English people
British pipe organ builders
People from Nottingham
Year of birth missing
Year of death missing